The Nervures Stromboli is a French two-place paraglider that was designed by Xavier Demoury and produced by Nervures of Soulom. It is now out of production.

Design and development
The Stromboli was designed as a tandem glider for flight training and as such was referred to as the Biplace Stromboli, indicating that it is a two seater.

Production ended in 2004 after 545 were produced.

Variants
Stromboli 38
Small-sized model for lighter pilots. The glider model is AFNOR Biplace certified.
Stromboli 42
Large-sized model for heavier pilots. The glider model is AFNOR Biplace certified.

Specifications (Stromboli 42)

References

External links

Official website

Stromboli
Paragliders